Stoermeropterus is a genus of prehistoric eurypterid from the Silurian period in Europe and North America classified as part of the Moselopteridae family. The genus contains three species, S. conicus and S. latus from Ringerike, Norway and S. nodosus from West Virginia.

See also 
 List of eurypterids

References 

Eurypterina
Silurian eurypterids
Silurian arthropods of North America
Silurian arthropods of Europe
Eurypterids of Europe
Eurypterids of North America